{{safesubst:#invoke:RfD|||month = March
|day = 20
|year = 2023
|time = 14:00
|timestamp = 20230320140054

|content=
REDIRECT FIFAe World Cup#Online qualification

}}